The 30th GLAAD Media Awards is the 2019 annual presentation of the GLAAD Media Awards, presented by GLAAD honoring the 2018 media season. The awards honor films, television shows, musicians and works of journalism that fairly, accurately and inclusively represent the LGBT community and issues relevant to the community. GLAAD announced the 151 nominees split across 27 categories on January 25, 2019 in Park City, Utah. Some of the awards were presented in Los Angeles on March 28, 2019 and the remaining awards were presented in New York City on May 4, 2019.

Category changes
Unlike in previous ceremonies, the 30th GLAAD Media Awards did not include the Outstanding Daily Drama category, while the award for Outstanding Video Game was presented for the first time. Additionally, Outstanding Talk Show Episode award was renamed the Outstanding Variety or Talk Show Episode. In order to reflect increased cinematic representation, GLAAD expanded the number of potential nominees in both film categories from five to ten nominees.

Winners and nominees
Winners are presented in bold.

Film
{| class=wikitable
| style="vertical-align:top; width:50%;"|

 Love, Simon (20th Century Fox) Blockers (Universal Studios)
 Crazy Rich Asians (Warner Bros.)
 Deadpool 2 (20th Century Fox)
 The Girl in the Spider's Web (Sony Pictures)
| style="vertical-align:top; width:50%;"|

 Boy Erased (Focus Features) 1985 (Wolfe Releasing)
 A Kid Like Jake (IFC Films)
 Can You Ever Forgive Me? (Fox Searchlight Pictures)
 Disobedience (Bleecker Street)
 The Favourite (Fox Searchlight Pictures)
  Hearts Beat Loud (Gunpowder & Sky)
 The Miseducation of Cameron Post (FilmRise)
 Saturday Church (Samuel Goldwyn Films)
 We the Animals (The Orchard)
|}

Television
{| class=wikitable
| style="vertical-align:top; width:50%;"|

 Vida (Starz) Brooklyn Nine-Nine (Fox)
 Crazy Ex-Girlfriend (The CW)
 Dear White People (Netflix)
 Modern Family (ABC)
 One Day at a Time (Netflix)
 Schitt's Creek (Pop)
 Superstore (NBC)
 This Close (SundanceNow)
 Will & Grace (NBC)
| style="vertical-align:top; width:50%;"|

 Pose (FX) Billions (Showtime)
 Black Lightning (The CW)
 Grey's Anatomy (ABC)
 The Handmaid's Tale (Hulu)
 Instinct (CBS)
 Shadowhunters (Freeform)
 Star (Fox)
 Supergirl (The CW)
 Wynonna Earp (Syfy)
|-
| style="vertical-align:top; width:50%;"|

 "Someplace Other Than Here" -  The Guest Book (TBS) "King in the North" - Fresh Off the Boat (ABC)
 "Prom" - Fuller House (Netflix)
 "Service" - Law and Order: S.V.U. (NBC)
 "She" - The Good Doctor (ABC)
| style="vertical-align:top; width:50%;"|

 The Assassination of Gianni Versace: American Crime Story (FX) American Horror Story: Apocalypse (FX)
 Life-Size 2 (Freeform)
 Sense8 (Netflix)
 A Very English Scandal (Amazon Prime)
|-
| style="vertical-align:top; width:50%;"|

 Steven Universe (Cartoon Network) Adventure Time (Cartoon Network)
 Andi Mack (Disney Channel)
 Anne with an E (Netflix)
 She-Ra and the Princesses of Power (Netflix)
| style="vertical-align:top; width:50%;"|

 Believer (HBO) Calling Her Ganda (Breaking Glass Pictures)
 My House (Viceland)
 Quiet Heroes (Logo)
 When the Beat Drops (Logo)
|-
| style="vertical-align:top; width:50%;"|

 Queer Eye (Netflix) American Idol (ABC)
 I Am Jazz (TLC)
 Love & Hip Hop (VH1)
 RuPaul's Drag Race (VH1)
| style="vertical-align:top; width:50%;"|

 "Trans Rights Under Attack" - Full Frontal with Samantha Bee (TBS) "Mike Pence and A Day in the Life of Marlon Bundo" - Last Week Tonight with John Oliver (HBO)
 "NRA Problems, Chicken Bone Problems, Birmingham Problems" - Wyatt Cenac's Problem Areas (HBO)
 "Troye Sivan Hopes Boy Erased Reaches All Parents" - The Late Show with Stephen Colbert (CBS)
 "Valedictorian Seth Owen" - The Ellen DeGeneres Show (NBC)
|-
| style="vertical-align:top; width:50%;"|

  (Netflix)  (Univision)  (Telemundo)
  (Univision)
| style="vertical-align:top; width:50%;"|
|}

Journalism

Other
{| class="wikitable sortable"
|-
! Award
! Nominees
|-
! scope="row" |Outstanding Blog
|Pittsburgh Lesbian CorrespondentsGays With Kids
Holy Bullies and Headless Monsters
My Fabulous Disease
TransGriot
|-
! scope="row" |Outstanding Comic Book
|Exit, Stage Left!: The Snagglepuss Chronicles (DC Comics)Batwoman (DC Comics)
Bingo Love (Image Comics)
Fence (Boom! Studios)
Iceman (Marvel Comics)
Lumberjanes: The Infernal Compass (Boom! Studios)
Oh Sh#!t It's Kim & Kim (Black Mask Comics)
Runaways (Marvel Comics)
Star Wars: Doctor Aphra (Marvel Comics)
Strangers in Paradise XXV (Abstract Studios)
|-
! scope="row" |Outstanding Music Artist
|
 Janelle Monáe - Dirty Computer
Brandi Carlile - By the Way, I Forgive You
Brockhampton - Iridescence
Christine and the Queens - Chris
Hayley Kiyoko - Expectations
Kim Petras - Turn Off the Light, Vol. 1
Shea Diamond - Seen It All
Sophie - Oil of Every Pearl's Un-Insides
Troye Sivan - Bloom
Years & Years - Palo Santo
|-
! scope="row" |Outstanding Video Game
|
The Elder Scrolls Online: Summerset (Bethesda Softworks)Assassin's Creed Odyssey (Ubisoft)
Guild Wars 2: Path of Fire (ArenaNet)
Pillars of Eternity II: Deadfire (Versus Evil)
The Sims Mobile (Electronic Arts)
|-
|}

Special RecognitionNanette (Netflix)
TransMilitary (Logo)

Special Honors
Advocate for Change Award: Madonna
Stephen F. Kolzak Award: Sean Hayes
Vanguard Award: Beyoncé and Jay-Z
Vito Russo Award: Andy Cohen

Bohemian Rhapsody controversy
Before the nominees were announced on January 25, 2019, the awards generated headlines when GLAAD announced that Bohemian Rhapsody, the 2018 biopic of Freddie Mercury and Queen which had, at that point, been nominated for several Academy Awards including Best Picture, was being withdrawn from consideration because of sexual misconduct allegations made against its director Bryan Singer. GLAAD issued a statement explaining that it was a "difficult decision" but added that "This week's story in The Atlantic documenting unspeakable harms endured by young men and teenage boys brought to light a reality that cannot be ignored or even tacitly rewarded. Singer's response to The Atlantic story wrongfully used ‘homophobia’ to deflect from sexual assault allegations and GLAAD urges the media and the industry at large to not gloss over the fact that survivors of sexual assault should be put first. The team that worked so hard on Bohemian Rhapsody as well as the legacy of Freddy Mercury deserve so much more than to be tainted in this way".

References

GLAAD Media Awards ceremonies
GLAAD Media
GLAAD Media Awards
GLAAD Media Awards
GLAAD Media Awards
GLAAD Media Awards